The 2005 Mexican Figure Skating Championships took place between 19 and 20 November 2004 in Lomas Verdes. Skaters competed in the disciplines of men's singles, ladies' singles, and ice dancing on the senior level. The results were used to choose the Mexican teams to the 2005 World Championships and the 2005 Four Continents Championships.

Senior results

Men

Ladies

Ice dancing

External links
 results

Mexican Figure Skating Championships, 2005
Mex
Figure Skating Championships, 2005
Fig
Mexican Figure Skating Championships